Bostock is a civil parish in Cheshire West and Chester, England. It contains 14 buildings that are recorded in the National Heritage List for England as designated listed buildings. The parish is entirely rural, and incorporates the settlement of Bostock Green, and the country house Bostock Hall. The hall is listed at Grade II*, the other buildings being at Grade II. The list includes the hall and its associated buildings, a farmhouse, a house in Bostock Green, and a milepost.

Key

Buildings

See also
Listed buildings in Byley
Listed buildings in Davenham
Listed buildings in Moulton
Listed buildings in Stanthorne
Listed buildings in Wimboldsley
Listed buildings in Winsford

References
Citations

Sources

Listed buildings in Cheshire West and Chester
Lists of listed buildings in Cheshire